Sebastian Fechner (born October 15, 1983 in Gostyń) is a Polish footballer who currently plays for Calisia Kalisz in the Polish Second League.

Career
In the summer 2010, he joined Sandecja Nowy Sącz on a two-year contract.

References

Notes
 

Polish footballers
Wisła Kraków players
Flota Świnoujście players
Lechia Gdańsk players
Sandecja Nowy Sącz players
1983 births
Living people
People from Gostyń
Sportspeople from Greater Poland Voivodeship
Association football defenders